Collin Creek Mall was a two-level, enclosed regional mall in Plano, Texas opened in 1981 and closed for redevelopment in 2019. It was located near the intersection of US 75 (Central Expressway) and President George Bush Turnpike. Since September 2019, the mall has been partially demolished with the central section planned to become part of a $1 billion mixed-use development, designed by Centurion American Development Group.

History
When the mall opened in July 1981, Collin Creek featured a River Walk: a series of fountains connected by an indoor creek. The mall also contained a "village" of small shops lining corridors narrower than the rest of the mall. The creek and most of the fountains were later removed, except for a small fountain left in the middle of the mall. Several years before the mall closed, plants were put in the remaining fountain.  The village shops were removed and the space converted into a food court as part of a remodeling project in 1992.

In 2008, Collin Creek Mall had a small remodel including new paint and new tile, much like what Richardson Square Mall had in 1998.

In 2018, the property was sold to Centurion American. On Friday, July 26, 2019, Collin Creek Mall had a farewell party to say goodbye to the mall. As of Wednesday, July 31, 2019, Collin Creek Mall is closed. Demolition and redevelopment began in September 2019.

Anchor tenants

JCPenney 
The JCPenney Co. department store was an original anchor tenant of the mall. It was the only operating store left on the property when the mall closed. On August 18, 2020, it was announced that JCPenney would be closing as part of a plan to close 155 stores nationwide. The store closed in November 2020.

Amazing Jake's 
The fifth anchor opened as a Lord & Taylor department store in 1981. Lord & Taylor closed in 1990, and was replaced by a Mervyn's department store. Mervyn's exited the Texas market in early 2006 and the anchor store was temporarily vacant.  In July 2008, the former Mervyn's was converted into a two-story Amazing Jake's indoor playland and buffet restaurant. By April 2019, Amazing Jake's was closed leaving the space vacant.

Sears 
The Sears Roebuck & Co. department store was an original anchor tenant of the mall. The store closed in March 2019 as part to closing 80 stores nationwide due to Sears and Roebuck Co. filing for Chapter 11 Bankruptcy.

Macy's 
This anchor location opened as a Sanger Harris department store. Sanger-Harris was merged with Foley's and renamed in 1987 then the combined company was sold to May Department Stores in 1988. The store was renamed Macy's in September 2006 as a result of May Company's purchase of the Federated Department Stores in 2005. The store's final business day was on March 26, 2017.

Dillard's 
The Dillard's department store was an original anchor tenant of Collin Creek, but closed in January 2014.

Economic factors
Since the mall's opening, the area near Collin Creek has witnessed explosive growth, and the addition of the President George Bush Turnpike.  The mall has suffered from fierce competition from newer nearby malls.  The August 2000 opening of new regional mall Stonebriar Centre in nearby Frisco affected the sales of Lewisville's Vista Ridge Mall (Vista Ridge was more directly affected by the October 1997 opening of the nearby Grapevine Mills in Grapevine) and Plano's Collin Creek Mall as both malls experienced what Larry Howard, vice president for development of General Growth Properties Inc., called "some cannibalization". Developer Sam Ware of Dreien Partners has recently introduced a $1 billion+ plan to revitalize the mall, by tearing down much of its north wing and opening up the creek beneath it, as well as adding office, hotel, and residential components. That deal fell through and Centurion American is making a proposal to raze the mall and redevelop it as a mixed-use center.

References

External links
Collin Creek Mall home page (defunct website)

Shopping malls in the Dallas–Fort Worth metroplex
Defunct shopping malls in the United States
Demolished shopping malls in the United States
Buildings and structures in Plano, Texas
Tourist attractions in Collin County, Texas
Brookfield Properties
Shopping malls established in 1981
Shopping malls disestablished in 2019